Micraglossa zhongguoensis is a moth in the family Crambidae. It was described by Wei-Chun Li, Hou-Hun Li and Matthias Nuss in 2010. It is found in China (Shaanxi, Anhui, Jiangsu, Shanghai, Sichuan, Zhejiang, Yunnan, Guizhou, Hunan, Hong Kong) and northern Vietnam.

References

Moths described in 2010
Scopariinae